The 1995–96 NBA season was the Jazz's 22nd season in the National Basketball Association, and 17th season in Salt Lake City, Utah. During the off-season, the Jazz signed free agents Chris Morris, Greg Foster, and second-year guard Howard Eisley. The team also released James Donaldson, who was out with a strained hamstring, to free agency in December. The Jazz got off to a fast start winning ten of their first twelve games, then later on holding a 32–16 record at the All-Star break, then winning seven straight games between February and March, and finishing second in the Midwest Division with a 55–27 record. They made their thirteenth consecutive trip to the playoffs.

John Stockton had another record breaking season, leading the NBA in assists for the ninth straight season, while breaking Maurice Cheeks career record in steals, and being named to the All-NBA Second Team, averaging 14.7 points, leading the league with 11.2 assists and contributing 1.7 steals per game. Meanwhile, Karl Malone moved into ninth place in all-time scoring, and was named to the All-NBA First Team, averaging 25.7 points, 9.8 rebounds and 1.7 steals per game. In addition, Jeff Hornacek provided the team with 15.2 points and 1.3 steals per game, while Morris contributed 10.5 points per game, and David Benoit provided with 8.2 points and 4.7 rebounds per game. Off the bench, Antoine Carr contributed 7.3 points per game, while Adam Keefe provided with 6.1 points and 5.5 rebounds per game, and Felton Spencer averaged 5.6 points and 4.3 rebounds per game. Both Stockton and Malone were selected for the 1996 NBA All-Star Game, and Malone finished in seventh place in Most Valuable Player voting.

In the Western Conference First Round of the playoffs, the Jazz defeated the Portland Trail Blazers in a full five game series, which included a 38-point margin in a 102–64 home win in Game 5. In the Western Conference Semi-finals, they continued to play strong basketball as they beat the Midwest Division champion San Antonio Spurs in six games. However, in the Western Conference Finals for the third time in five years, they lost to the Seattle SuperSonics in seven games. The Sonics would reach the NBA Finals, but would lose in six games to the Chicago Bulls.

Following the season, Benoit signed as a free agent with the New Jersey Nets, and Spencer was traded to the Orlando Magic.

Draft picks

Roster

Roster Notes
 Center James Donaldson was waived on December 4.

Regular season

Season standings

Record vs. opponents

Game log

Playoffs

|- align="center" bgcolor="#ccffcc"
| 1
| April 25
| Portland
| W 110–102
| Karl Malone (33)
| Karl Malone (9)
| John Stockton (23)
| Delta Center19,614
| 1–0
|- align="center" bgcolor="#ccffcc"
| 2
| April 27
| Portland
| W 105–90
| Karl Malone (30)
| Karl Malone (14)
| John Stockton (16)
| Delta Center19,911
| 2–0
|- align="center" bgcolor="#ffcccc"
| 3
| April 29
| @ Portland
| L 91–94 (OT)
| Karl Malone (35)
| David Benoit (11)
| John Stockton (11)
| Rose Garden21,401
| 2–1
|- align="center" bgcolor="#ffcccc"
| 4
| May 1
| @ Portland
| L 90–98
| Jeff Hornacek (30)
| Malone, Morris (6)
| John Stockton (11)
| Rose Garden21,401
| 2–2
|- align="center" bgcolor="#ccffcc"
| 5
| May 5
| Portland
| W 102–64
| Karl Malone (25)
| Karl Malone (10)
| John Stockton (11)
| Delta Center19,682
| 3–2
|-

|- align="center" bgcolor="#ccffcc"
| 1
| May 7
| @ San Antonio
| W 95–75
| Karl Malone (23)
| Karl Malone (7)
| John Stockton (19)
| Alamodome15,112
| 1–0
|- align="center" bgcolor="#ffcccc"
| 2
| May 9
| @ San Antonio
| L 77–88
| Karl Malone (24)
| Malone, Ostertag (8)
| John Stockton (13)
| Alamodome18,635
| 1–1
|- align="center" bgcolor="#ccffcc"
| 3
| May 11
| San Antonio
| W 105–75
| Karl Malone (32)
| Karl Malone (11)
| John Stockton (7)
| Delta Center19,911
| 2–1
|- align="center" bgcolor="#ccffcc"
| 4
| May 12
| San Antonio
| W 101–86
| Chris Morris (25)
| Adam Keefe (7)
| John Stockton (10)
| Delta Center19,911
| 3–1
|- align="center" bgcolor="#ffcccc"
| 5
| May 14
| @ San Antonio
| L 87–98
| Karl Malone (24)
| Karl Malone (12)
| John Stockton (8)
| Alamodome34,215
| 3–2
|- align="center" bgcolor="#ccffcc"
| 6
| May 16
| San Antonio
| W 108–81
| Karl Malone (25)
| Karl Malone (13)
| John Stockton (13)
| Delta Center19,911
| 4–2
|-

|- align="center" bgcolor="#ffcccc"
| 1
| May 18
| @ Seattle
| L 72–102
| Karl Malone (21)
| Karl Malone (8)
| John Stockton (7)
| KeyArena17,072
| 0–1
|- align="center" bgcolor="#ffcccc"
| 2
| May 20
| @ Seattle
| L 87–91
| Karl Malone (32)
| Karl Malone (13)
| John Stockton (7)
| KeyArena17,072
| 0–2
|- align="center" bgcolor="#ccffcc"
| 3
| May 24
| Seattle
| W 96–76
| Malone, Hornacek (28)
| Karl Malone (18)
| Jeff Hornacek (8)
| Delta Center19,911
| 1–2
|- align="center" bgcolor="#ffcccc"
| 4
| May 26
| Seattle
| L 86–88
| Karl Malone (25)
| Karl Malone (12)
| Malone, Stockton (8)
| Delta Center19,911
| 1–3
|- align="center" bgcolor="#ccffcc"
| 5
| May 28
| @ Seattle
| W 98–95 (OT)
| Karl Malone (29)
| Karl Malone (15)
| John Stockton (6)
| KeyArena17,072
| 2–3
|- align="center" bgcolor="#ccffcc"
| 6
| May 30
| Seattle
| W 118–83
| Karl Malone (32)
| Karl Malone (10)
| John Stockton (12)
| Delta Center19,911
| 3–3
|- align="center" bgcolor="#ffcccc"
| 7
| June 2
| @ Seattle
| L 86–90
| Malone, Stockton (22)
| John Stockton (8)
| Malone, Stockton (7)
| KeyArena17,072
| 3–4
|-

Player statistics

Season

Playoffs

Awards and records
 Karl Malone, All-NBA First Team
 John Stockton, All-NBA Second Team

Transactions

References

Utah Jazz seasons
Utah
Utah
Utah